Kaiwera is a rural settlement and community in Southland, New Zealand.

It includes Nithdale Station, a beef, dairy, sheep and forestry farm, with a Romney and Suffolk Stud. It accommodates visitors with a self-contained homestead and farm tours.

Kaiwera Downs Wind Farm is located south-west of Kaiwera.

Kaiwera is part of the wider Waimumu-Kaiwera statistical area.

History
Kaiwera School opened about 1879, and closed in 2009.

By 1907, the local community was holding an annual picnic and sports day at the settlement.

In 1924, Charles Tripp (a grandson of the runholder Charles Tripp) took over the Nithdale Station farm. He converted the rundown 1,478 hectare property, dominated by gorse and rabbits, into a productive farm, which he worked until his death in 1991. Andrew and Heather Tripp has farmed the property since then.

In 2015, a person was killed in a farm accident in Kaiwera.

References

Populated places in Southland, New Zealand
Gore District, New Zealand